The Roman Catholic Diocese of Machiques is a diocese located in the Roman Catholic Archdiocese of Maracaibo in Venezuela.

History
On 26 May 1943 Pope Pius XII erected the diocese as an Apostolic Vicariate.  The Vicariate was elevated to a full diocese by Pope Benedict XVI on 9 April 2011.

Ordinaries
Ángel Turrado Moreno, O.F.M. Cap. † (4 Sep 1944 – Jan 1954)
Miguel Saturnino Aurrecoechea Palacios, O.F.M. Cap. † (19 Dec 1955 – 10 Mar 1986)
Agustín Romualdo Alvarez Rodríguez, O.F.M. Cap. † (10 Mar 1986 – 7 Oct 1995)
Ramiro Díaz Sánchez, O.M.I. (24 Jan 1997 – 9 Apr 2011)
Jesús Alfonso Guerrero Contreras, O.F.M. Cap. (9 Apr 2011 – 21 Dec 2018), appointed Bishop of Barinas
Nicolás Gregorio Nava Rojas (19 Oct 2019 -

See also
Roman Catholicism in Venezuela

Sources
 GCatholic.org
 Catholic Hierarchy

Roman Catholic dioceses in Venezuela
Roman Catholic Ecclesiastical Province of Maracaibo
Christian organizations established in 1943
Roman Catholic dioceses and prelatures established in the 20th century
1943 establishments in Venezuela
Machiques